Eastern Air Lines, also colloquially known as Eastern, was a major United States airline from 1926 to 1991. Before its dissolution, it was headquartered at Miami International Airport in an unincorporated area of Miami-Dade County, Florida.

Eastern was one of the "Big Four" domestic airlines created by the Spoils Conferences of 1930, and was headed by World War I flying ace Eddie Rickenbacker in its early years. It had a near monopoly in air travel between New York and Florida from the 1930s until the 1950s and dominated this market for decades afterward.

During airline deregulation in the late 1970s and early 1980s, labor disputes and high debt loads strained the company under the leadership of former astronaut Frank Borman. Frank Lorenzo acquired Eastern in 1985 and moved many of its assets to his other airlines, including Continental Airlines and Texas Air. After continued labor disputes and a crippling strike in 1989, Eastern ran out of money and was liquidated in 1991.

American Airlines obtained many of Eastern's routes from Miami to Latin America and the Caribbean, while Delta Air Lines, Eastern's main competitor at Hartsfield Airport in Atlanta, acquired many of Eastern's Lockheed L-1011 aircraft. USAir acquired 11 of Eastern's 25 Boeing 757-225 aircraft.

Eastern pioneered hourly air shuttle services between New York City, Washington, DC, and Boston in 1961 as the Eastern Air Lines Shuttle. It took over the South American route network of Braniff International upon its shutdown in 1982 and also served London Gatwick in 1985 via its McDonnell Douglas DC-10-30 "Golden Wings" service. Although Eastern announced on its March 2, 1986 timetable that it would serve Madrid, Spain effective May 1, 1986, the service did not commence. The only scheduled trans-Atlantic service Eastern provided was Miami to London Gatwick, commencing on July 15, 1985, which was discontinued in 1986 and replaced with codeshare flights from Atlanta via British Caledonian Airways.

History

Origins

Eastern Air Lines was a composite of assorted air travel corporations, including Florida Airways and Pitcairn Aviation. In the late 1920s, Pitcairn Aviation won a contract to fly mail between New York City and Atlanta, Georgia on Mailwing single-engine aircraft. In 1929, Clement Keys, the owner of North American Aviation, purchased Pitcairn. In 1930, Keys changed the company's name to Eastern Air Transport. After being purchased by General Motors and experiencing a change in leadership after the Airmail Act of 1934, the airline became known as Eastern Air Lines.

Growth under Rickenbacker

By 1937, Eastern's route system stretched from New York to Washington, Atlanta, and New Orleans, and from Chicago to Miami. In the same year, it operated 20 daily flights and returns, every hour on the hour, between New York and Washington; the flight time was one hour, twenty minutes, one-way.

In 1938 World War I flying ace Eddie Rickenbacker bought Eastern from General Motors.

Rickenbacker pushed Eastern into a period of growth and innovation; for a time Eastern was the most profitable airline in the post-war era, never needing state subsidy. In the late 1950s Eastern's position was eroded by subsidies to rival airlines and the arrival of the jet age. On October 1, 1959, Rickenbacker's position as CEO was taken over by Malcolm A. MacIntyre, a brilliant lawyer but a man inexperienced in airline operations.' Rickenbacker's ouster was largely due to his reluctance to acquire expensive jets as he underestimated their appeal to the public. A new management team headed by Floyd D. Hall took over on 16 December 1963, and Rickenbacker left his position as director and chairman of the board on December 31, 1963, aged 73.

In 1956 Eastern bought Colonial Airlines, giving the airline its first routes to Canada.

The Jet Age

In November 1959, Eastern Air Lines opened its Chester L. Churchill-designed Terminal 1 at New York City's Idlewild International Airport (later renamed John F. Kennedy International Airport). In 1960, Eastern's first jets, Douglas DC-8-21s, started to take over the longer flights, like the non-stops from Chicago and New York to Miami. The DC-8s were joined in 1962 by the Boeing 720 and in 1964 by the Boeing 727-100, which Eastern (along with American Airlines and United Airlines) had helped Boeing to develop. On February 1, 1964, Eastern was the first airline to fly the 727. Shortly after that, "Captain Eddie" Rickenbacker retired and a new image was adopted, which included the now famous hockey stick design, officially Caribbean Blue over Ionosphere Blue. Eastern was also the first US carrier to fly the Airbus A300 and the launch customer for the Boeing 757.

On April 30, 1961, Eastern inaugurated Eastern Air Lines Shuttle. Initially 95-seat Lockheed Constellation 1049s and 1049Cs left New York-LaGuardia every two hours, 8 am to 10 pm, to Washington National and to Boston. Flights soon became hourly, 7 am to 10 pm out of each city. No reservations or tickets were required; passengers could pay their fare in cash on board the flight.  If a plane filled up at departure time, another plane was rolled out to carry any extra passengers.

Internationalization began as Eastern opened routes to markets such as Santo Domingo and Nassau, Bahamas. Services from San Juan, Puerto Rico's Luis Muñoz Marín International Airport were expanded. In 1967, Eastern purchased Mackey Airlines, a small air carrier primarily operating in Florida and the Bahamas as part of this expansion.

Eastern bought the Lockheed L-1011 TriStar and Airbus A300 widebody jets; the former would become known in the Caribbean as El Grandote (the huge one). Although Eastern had purchased four 747s, the delivery slots were sold to Trans World Airlines (TWA) when Eastern decided to purchase the L-1011.

Due to massive delays in the L-1011 program, mainly due to problems with the Rolls-Royce RB211 engines, Eastern leased two Boeing 747-100s from Pan Am between 1970 and 1972 and operated the aircraft between Chicago and San Juan as well as from New York to Miami and San Juan.

Just before Walt Disney World opened in 1971, Eastern became its "official airline". It remained the official airline of Walt Disney World and sponsored a ride at the Magic Kingdom park (If You Had Wings in Tomorrowland where Buzz Lightyear's Space Ranger Spin is currently located) until its contracting route network forced Disney to switch to Delta shortly before Eastern's 1989 bankruptcy filing.

The famous "Wings of Man" campaign in the late 1960s was created by advertising agency Young & Rubicam, and restored Eastern's tarnished image until the late 1970s, when former astronaut Frank Borman became president and it was replaced by a new campaign, "We Have To Earn Our Wings Every Day". The new campaign, which featured Borman as a spokesperson, was used until the mid-to-late 1980s.

Under bankruptcy, Eastern launched a "100 Days" campaign, in which it promised to "become a little bit better every day".

Turmoil

In 1975, Eastern was headquartered at 10 Rockefeller Plaza in New York City. After Frank Borman became president of Eastern Air Lines in late 1975, he moved Eastern's headquarters from Rockefeller Center to Miami-Dade County, Florida.

Eastern's massive Atlanta hub was in direct competition with Delta Air Lines, where the two carriers competed heavily to neither's benefit. Delta's less-unionized work force and slowly expanding international route network helped lead it through the turbulent period following deregulation in 1978.

In 1980, a Caribbean hub was started at Luis Muñoz Marín International Airport (known at the time as "Isla Verde International Airport") near San Juan, Puerto Rico. In 1982, Eastern acquired Braniff's South American route network. By 1985, Eastern was the largest IATA airline in terms of passengers and operated in 26 countries on three continents.

During this era, Eastern's fleet was split between their "silver-colored hockey stick" livery (the lack of paint reduced weight by 100 pounds) and their "white-colored hockey stick" livery (on its Airbus-manufactured planes, the metallurgy of which required paint to cover the aircraft's composite skin panels).

In 1983 Eastern became the launch customer of Boeing's 757, which was ordered in 1978. Borman felt that its low cost of operation would make it an invaluable asset to the airline in the years to come. However, higher oil prices failed to materialize and the debt created by this purchase coupled with the Airbus A300 purchases in 1977 contributed to the February 1986 sale to Frank Lorenzo's Texas Air. At that time, Eastern was paying over $700,000 in interest each day before they sold a ticket, fueled, or boarded a single aircraft.

Starting about 1985, Eastern offered "Moonlight Specials", with passenger seats on overnight flights scheduled for cargo from thirty freight companies. The flights, which operated between midnight and 7 am, served 18 cities in the United States connecting mainly to Houston (IAH). Eric Schmitt of The New York Times said that the services were "a hybrid of late-night, red-eye flights and the barebones People Express approach to service." The holds of the aircraft were reserved for cargo such as express mail, machine tool parts, and textiles. Because of this, the airline allowed each passenger to take up to two carry-on bags. The airline charged $10 for each checked bag, which was shipped standby. The airline charged between 50 cents and $3 for beverages and snacks. Bunny Duck, an Eastern flight attendant quoted in The New York Times, said that the passengers on the special flights were "a cross section of families, college kids, illegal aliens and weirdos from L.A.".

Eastern began losing money as it faced competition from no-frills airlines, such as People Express, which offered lower fares. In an attempt to differentiate itself from its bargain competitors, Eastern began a marketing campaign stressing its quality of service and its rank of highly experienced pilots.

Sale to Texas Air 
Unable to keep up, Borman agreed to the sale of the airline in 1986 to Texas Air, led by Frank Lorenzo, which had already purchased Continental Airlines and lost a bidding war for TWA to Carl Icahn.

In February 1987, the Federal Aviation Administration imposed a $9.5 million fine against Eastern Air Lines for safety violations, which was the largest fine assessed against an airline until American Airlines was fined $24.2 million in 2010.

In 1988, Phil Bakes, the president of Eastern Air Lines, announced plans to lay off 4,000 employees and eliminate and reduce service to airports in the Western United States; he said that the airline was going "back to our roots" in the East. At the time, Eastern was the largest corporate employer in the Miami area and remained so after the cuts. John Nordheimer wrote in The New York Times that Eastern's prominence in the Miami area decreased as the city became a finance and trade center with a diversified local economy, instead of one based largely on tourism.

During Lorenzo's tenure, Eastern was crippled by severe labor unrest. Asked to accept deep cuts in pay and benefits, on March 4, 1989, Lorenzo locked out Eastern's mechanics and ramp service employees, represented by the International Association of Machinists and Aerospace Workers (IAM). Concerned that Lorenzo's successful breaking of the IAM would do the same to the pilots' and flight attendants' unions, the pilots represented by Air Line Pilots Association (ALPA) and flight attendants represented by the Transport Workers Union (TWU) called a sympathy strike, which effectively shut down the airline's domestic operations. Non-contract employees, including airport gate and ticket counter agents and reservation sales agents, could not honor the strike. Due to the lockout and sympathy strike, cancelled flights resulted in the loss of millions of dollars in revenue.

In 1989, Lorenzo sold Eastern Air Lines Shuttle to real estate mogul Donald Trump (who named it the Trump Shuttle) while selling other parts of Eastern to his Texas Air holding company and its subsidiary, Continental Airlines, at terms disadvantageous to Eastern. That same year, George Berry, the Georgia Industry and Trade Commissioner, asked Eastern to consider moving its headquarters from Miami to Atlanta.

As a result of the strike, a weakened airline structure, high fuel prices, an inability to compete after deregulation and other financial problems, Eastern filed for bankruptcy protection on March 9, 1989, which allowed Lorenzo to continue operating the airline with non-union employees. However, in 1990, the courts removed Eastern from Texas Air's control, citing neglect and mismanagement. A report prepared by David Shapiro, an examiner appointed by the bankruptcy court overseeing Eastern's bankruptcy filing, concluded that Eastern was shortchanged by Texas Air in numerous transactions between the two. For example, Texas Air bought assets like System One, a computer reservation operation, from Eastern at a price far below market value. The court appointed Martin Shugrue as Eastern's trustee to oversee its operations. Eastern tried to remain in business in an attempt to correct its cash flow, but to no avail.

Ultimately, Eastern Airlines stopped flying at midnight on Saturday, January 19, 1991. The previous evening, company agents, unaware of the decision, continued to take reservations and told callers that the airline was not closing. Following the announcement, 5,000 of the 18,000 employees immediately lost their jobs. Of the remaining employees, reservation agents were told to report to work at their regular times, while other employees were told not to report to work unless asked to do so. The Eastern shutdown eliminated many airline industry jobs in the Miami and New York City areas.

Company slogans

 First in on-time dependability (1963)
 See How Much Better An Airline Can Be (1963-late 1960s) 
 We want everyone to fly (1967-late 1960s)
 Number one to the sun (late 1960s)
 We earn our wings every day (early 1970s-mid-1980s)
 The wings of man (1970s-mid-1980s)
 We Have To Earn Our Wings Every Day (1980-mid-1980s)
 We've got your sunshine (mid-1980s)
 America's Favorite way to Fly (Spanish variant: "Su forma favorita de volar")  (late 1980s)
 Official Airline of the Tampa Bay Bucs (late 1980s)
 100 Days (Early 1990–1991)
 The second largest airline in the free world
 Las Alas de America (Spanish 1980–1991)

Destinations

Fleet

Eastern Air Lines flew many different types of aircraft throughout its history.

Eastern Express, Eastern Metro Express, Eastern Partner and Caribair

Several regional and commuter airlines provided passenger feed for Eastern via code sharing agreements with their aircraft liveries reflecting the Eastern mainline paint scheme.  There were a number of brandings including: Eastern Express, Eastern Atlantis Express, and Eastern Metro Express.  LIAT, a Caribbean-based airline, also operated Eastern Partner service.

Eastern Express air carriers and their aircraft included:

Air Midwest operating Fairchild Swearingen Metroliner (Metro II model) turboprops
Atlantis Airlines operating British Aerospace BAe Jetstream 31, de Havilland Canada DHC-6 Twin Otter and Fairchild Swearingen Metroliner turboprops
Bar Harbor Airlines operating ATR-42, Beechcraft 1900C, Beechcraft 99 and Saab 340A turboprops 
Metro Airlines operating de Havilland Canada DHC-6 Twin Otter turboprops
Precision Airlines operating Dornier 228 turboprops
Provincetown-Boston Airlines (PBA) operating Douglas DC-3 prop aircraft
Sunaire (Aviation Associates), a division of Metro Airlines operating de Havilland Canada DHC-6 Twin Otter turboprops

Eastern Atlantis Express was operated by Atlantis Airlines with BAe Jetstream 31 aircraft.

Eastern Metro Express was operated by Metro Airlines and was based at Eastern's Atlanta (ATL) hub operating British Aerospace BAe Jetstream 31 and de Havilland Canada DHC-8-100 Dash 8 turboprops.

Eastern Partner was operated by a Caribbean-based airline, Leeward Islands Air Transport, with turboprop service between Eastern's San Juan hub and Antigua, St. Kitts and St. Maarten.

Eastern also worked closely with another Caribbean-based airline, Caribair (Puerto Rico). The June 13, 1967 Eastern system timetable lists connecting flights operated by Caribair Convair 640 turboprops with service between Eastern's San Juan hub and St. Croix and St. Thomas. By 1970, San Juan-based Caribair had become an all-jet airline operating McDonnell Douglas DC-9-30 aircraft serving fourteen Caribbean islands as well as Miami with the air carrier subsequently being acquired by Eastern in 1973.

Accidents and incidents

Fatal accidents
 10 August 1937, Trip 7, a Douglas DC-2 (NC13739), crashed on takeoff at Daytona Beach Municipal Airport after it struck a utility pylon during a nighttime take off, killing four of nine on board.
 26 February 1941, Flight 21, a Douglas DST, crashed near Atlanta in fog due to a misread altimeter, almost killing Eddie Rickenbacker, who was traveling on airline business. His recovery in the hospital received broad press coverage; during his initial recovery, several incorrect news reports claimed that he had died. Of 16 on board, 8 died, including Congressman William D. Byron. Clara Savage Littledale, editor of Parents magazine, survived. Littledale recounted her experience of the crash for Parents.  Her husband, Pulitzer Prize–winning journalist Harold A. Littledale, was paralyzed as a result of the crash.
 12 July 1945: Flight 45, a Douglas DC-3-201C (NC25647) flying from Washington, DC to Columbia, SC, collided in mid-air with USAAF A-26C Invader near Florence, South Carolina. The A-26 lost control and crashed; two crew parachuted but only one survived. The DC-3 executed a forced landing in a cornfield, killing one passenger, a two-year-old boy.
 7 September 1945: Flight 42, a Douglas DC-3-201G (NC33631), crashed near Florence, South Carolina following an unexplained fire in the rear of the aircraft. Control was lost after the right elevator also caught fire and the aircraft crashed in a swampy, wooded area, killing all 22 on board.
 30 December 1945: Flight 14, a Douglas DC-3-201 (NC18123), overran the runway while landing at LaGuardia Airport after approaching too high and too fast, killing one of 14 of board.
 18 January 1946: Flight 105, a Douglas DC-3-201E (NC19970), crashed at Cheshire, Connecticut after a loss of control caused by wing separation, killing all 17 on board. A fire, caused by a fuel leak, started in the left engine and spread to the wing, causing it to collapse and fail.
 12 January 1947: Flight 665, a Douglas C-49 (NC88872), crashed at Galax, Virginia after the pilot deviated from the flight route, killing 18 of 19 on board.
 30 May 1947: Flight 605, a Douglas DC-4 en route from Newark to Miami, crashed near Bainbridge, Maryland, killing all 53 aboard. At the time, Flight 605 was the deadliest crash in United States aviation history. "Loss of control" was cited as the reason for the crash.
 13 January 1948: Flight 572, a Douglas DC-3-201F (NC28384), crashed at Oxon Hill, Maryland after striking trees while on approach to Washington National Airport, killing five of nine on board; the aircraft was flying too low.
 7 February 1948: Flight 611, a Lockheed L-649 Constellation (NC112A), suffered a propeller blade separation over the Atlantic Ocean 156 mi off Brunswick, Georgia. Three hours after takeoff, the number three propeller failed and a portion of a blade penetrated the fuselage, cutting control cables, electrical wires and engine controls and killing a crew member before exiting the fuselage on the opposite side. After this the front portion of the number three engine broke free and fell off. A rapid descent was initiated. At 12,000 feet the descent was stopped. Due to instrument failure the aircraft descended visually to 1,000 feet. On landing the number four engine was shut down and the brakes applied hard which blew out a tire. Fires started in the landing gear and number four engine but were quickly extinguished. Despite the damage, the aircraft was repaired and returned to service.
 1 November 1949: Flight 537, a Douglas DC-4 (N88727) on approach to Washington National Airport, collided in mid-air with a Lockheed P-38 Lightning being test-flown for acceptance by the Government of Bolivia, killing all 55 aboard the DC-4 and seriously injuring the pilot of the P-38. At the time it was the deadliest airliner crash in United States history.
 19 October 1953: A Lockheed L-749A Constellation (N119A) from Idlewild International Airport to San Juan, Puerto Rico, crashed shortly after takeoff, killing two of 27 on board.
 December 21, 1955: A Lockheed L-749A Constellation (N112A) crashed on approach to Jacksonville's Imeson Airport arriving from Miami, with further scheduled stops at Washington, DC, New York and Boston. Twelve passengers and a crew of five were killed.
 4 October 1960: Flight 375 (a Lockheed L-188 Electra) departing Boston's Logan International Airport for Philadelphia crashed on takeoff after striking a flock of birds. Sixty-two of the 72 passengers and crew were killed.
 30 November 1962: Flight 512 (a Douglas DC-7) crashed during a go around after failing to land due to fog at Idlewild Airport (now JFK) in New York City. Of the 51 passengers and crew on board, 25 were killed.
 25 February 1964: Flight 304 (a Douglas DC-8) flying from New Orleans International Airport to Washington-National Airport crashed into Lake Pontchartrain en route due to "degradation of aircraft stability characteristics in turbulence, because of abnormal longitudinal trim component positions." All 51 passengers and seven crew aboard were killed.
 8 February 1965: Flight 663, a Douglas DC-7 departing from New York City to Richmond, Virginia, crashed at Jones Beach State Park after takeoff from JFK when it was forced to evade inbound Pan Am Flight 212. All 84 on board died. The evasive action was blamed for causing the plane to lose control.
 4 December 1965: Flight 853, a Lockheed L-1049C Super Constellation, collided with TWA Flight 42, a Boeing 707, over Carmel, New York. The Constellation crashed on Hunt Mountain in North Salem, New York, killing four of 53 on board while the 707 landed safely with no casualties.
 29 December 1972: Flight 401 (a brand new Lockheed L-1011) was preparing to land in Miami, when the flight crew became distracted by a non-functioning gear light. The flight crashed in the Everglades, killing 101 of 176 on board. This was the first major crash of a widebody jet aircraft.
 11 September 1974: Flight 212, a Douglas DC-9-31 carrying 78 passengers and four crew, crashed while conducting an instrument approach in dense ground fog at Douglas Municipal Airport. The aircraft crashed just short of the runway, killing 72; three survivors subsequently died from their injuries. Killed on this flight were James, Peter, and Paul Colbert, the father and older brothers (respectively) of comedian Stephen Colbert.
 24 June 1975: Flight 66, a Boeing 727, crashed into runway approach lights as it penetrated a thunderstorm near the ILS localizer course line at JFK in New York City, killing 113 passengers and crew. The official cause of the accident was a sudden high rate of descent, caused by severe downdrafts from the thunderstorm, and the continued use of the runway despite the hazardous weather. ABA basketball star Wendell Ladner was one of the passengers killed in the crash.
 1 January 1985: Flight 980, a Boeing 727 struck Mount Illimani on a flight from Silvio Pettirossi International Airport in Asunción, Paraguay, to El Alto International Airport in La Paz, Bolivia. All 19 passengers and 10 crew were killed on impact.

Non-fatal accidents and incidents
 19 December 1936: A Douglas DC-2-112 (NC13732) struck trees and crashed near Milford, Connecticut due to pilot error and radio problems; all 11 on board survived. The aircraft was leased from North American Aviation.
 18 October 1938: A Douglas DC-2-112 (NC13735) had engine failure while taking off from Montgomery, Alabama.  The engine caught fire and fell from the plane.  The plane struck a tree upon landing in a field just a few miles from the airport.  All 13 on board, including the crew of 3, survived with only the Captain, John David Hissong, sustaining minor burns.
 3 April 1941: A Douglas DC-3-201B (NC21727) crashed into water off Vero Beach, Florida during a storm; although all 16 on board were injured, none were killed. The aircraft was written off.
 19 November 1943: Trip 12, a Douglas DC-3-201E (NC19968), made an emergency landing at New Orleans en route from Houston after the pilot allowed the aircraft to descend too low during the second attempt to land. The number one propeller hit the water, causing portions of the engine and cowling to break off. All 15 on board survived. The aircraft was repaired and returned to service.
 11 October 1946: Flight 546, a Douglas C-54B (NC88729), struck a ridge near Alexandria, Virginia while on approach to Washington National Airport; all 26 on board survived. During the approach, the aircraft had descended too low.
 19 December 1946: Flight 605, a Douglas C-54B (NC88813) collided in mid-air with Universal Air Lines Flight 7, a Douglas C-47 (NC54374), near Aberdeen, Maryland. The C-47 departed Newark for Raleigh, while the C-54 departed Newark 15 minutes later for a non-stop flight to Miami. Near Aberdeen the C-54 flew past the C-47. The C-54 co-pilot saw the lights of an aircraft close and to the left of the C-54, which turned out to be the C-47. The C-54 pilot rolled into a right bank and forcefully pulled up the nose, causing the rear of the C-54 to strike the forward top portion of the C-47. The C-47 landed safely at Philips Army Air Field while the C-54 diverted to Washington. There were no casualties on either aircraft and both aircraft were repaired and returned to service.
 21 January 1948: Flight 604, a Lockheed L-649 Constellation (NC111A), crashed into a snow bank while landing at Logan International Airport following a loss of control due to a snow-covered runway; all 25 on board survived.

 19 July 1951: Flight 601, a Lockheed L-749A Constellation (N119A), suffered severe buffeting after an access door opened in flight. A flapless wheels-up landing was made at Curles Neck Farm, Virginia. The aircraft was later repaired and returned to service.
 27 November 1951: Flight 167, a Douglas DC-3-201C (N25646) collided in mid-air with Civil Air Patrol Piper L-4J 45-5151 near Ocala, Florida. The Piper was climbing after a left turn when it struck the DC-3. The DC-3's number one propeller made several cuts in the Piper's left wing, causing a loss of control and the Piper crashed, killing the pilot. The DC-3 circled the airport for a few minutes before landing safely with no casualties.
 6 September 1953: An L-1049 Super Constellation (N6214C) crashed on landing at McChord Air Force Base due to a hydraulic failure caused by engine problems; all 32 on board survived.
 8 May 1954: Eastern Air Lines Flight 2634W made an emergency landing at Naval Auxiliary Air Station Edenton (now Northeastern Regional Airport)in Edenton, NC. All crew and passengers survived. This is according to a letter written by chairman of the board, Eddie Rickenbacker to Marine Air Base Squadron 14.
 17 February 1956: A Martin 4-0-4 (N445A) crashed near Owensboro, Kentucky, due to pilot error; all 23 on board survived. The aircraft stalled and crashed following an improperly executed final approach.
 10 March 1957: A Martin 4-0-4 (N453A) crashed on landing at Standiford Field due to pilot error; all 34 on board survived. A portion of the left wing separated inboard of the number one engine due to excessive sink rate caused by the pilot's landing approach technique.
 28 June 1957: A Douglas DC-7B (N808D) had just returned from a training flight and was taxiing to the maintenance hangar at Miami International Airport when it collided with a parked Eastern Air Lines L-1049 Super Constellation (N6212C) near the hangar. Fuel leaked and both aircraft caught fire and burned out.
 17 March 1958: A Martin 4-0-4 (N496A) (Flight # unknown) on final approach to Melbourne Municipal Airport in Melbourne, Florida, struck an unmarked pile of gravel at the approach end of the runway. During the landing roll the landing gear collapsed, and the aircraft caught fire and burned. All 10 occupants (3 crew, 7 passengers) evacuated safely.
 18 October 1966: A Lockheed L-1049C Super Constellation (N6219C) caught fire during refueling at Miami after a fuel line ruptured, causing substantial damage to the wing.    The aircraft was written off, and broken up in June 1967.
 18 May 1972: Flight 346, a Douglas DC-9-31 (N8961E) landed hard at Fort Lauderdale International Airport, collapsing the landing gear and breaking off the tail; all ten on board survived.
 27 November 1973: Flight 300, a McDonnell Douglas DC-9-31 inbound from Pittsburgh International Airport to Akron-Canton Airport landed too far down the runway, hydroplaned and went off the end of the runway and over an embankment in fog, low ceilings, light rain and 1.5 mile visibility. The aircraft was severely damaged and written off. All 26 on board (5 crew, 21 passengers) survived with various injuries.
 2 July 1976: A Lockheed L-188 Electra (N5531) was blown up on the ground by a bomb at Logan International Airport.
 26 September 1978: Eastern Air Lines Flight 75, an L-1011, overtook Air Caribbean Flight 309, a Beech 18, on approach to Isla Verde International Airport in San Juan, Puerto Rico. There were no injuries on the Eastern airplane, but all six occupants on the Air Caribbean plane were killed when it plummeted and crashed on to a local bar. Eastern Airlines and the FAA later settled with family members of the six dead people as well as injured bar clients, paying them almost $5,700,000 dollars for damages.
 5 May 1983: Flight 855, a Lockheed L-1011 TriStar, had all three engines shut down in flight. The pilot restarted one of the engines before returning to Miami International Airport. All 172 on board survived.
 15 September 1987: Flight 216, a Boeing 727 (N8857E), was seriously damaged in a hard landing in severe winds at Tulsa International Airport; the 55 passengers and 7 crew were not injured. The aircraft was inspected by mechanics at the American Airlines Tulsa maintenance base and cleared to fly; it was then flown to Kansas City and Chicago with passengers, only to be removed from service after skin wrinkles in the fuselage were noticed. A senior American Airlines official later conceded that the Tulsa mechanics "erred" in their inspection.
 27 December 1987: Flight 573, a Douglas DC-9-31 (N8948E), landed hard at Pensacola Regional Airport. The nose gear touched down first, and the aircraft bounced and touched down again, breaking the passenger cabin aft of the wings. The plane stopped with its tail resting on the runway but all 103 passengers and 4 crew survived.
 18 January 1990: Eastern Air Lines Flight 111, a Boeing 727 (N8867E), collided with an Epps Air Service Beechcraft King Air upon landing at Atlanta-William B. Hartsfield International Airport, Georgia. The plane received substantial damage, but all 149 passengers and 8 crew members survived unharmed. The plane was later repaired. The King Air was destroyed, with the pilot killed and the first officer seriously injured.

Hijackings

 24 July 1961: Flight 202, a Lockheed L-188 Electra, was hijacked to Cuba. A fighter plane from Homestead AFB followed the airliner until it reached Cuban airspace.
 20 September 1968: Flight 950, a Boeing 720, was hijacked to Cuba.
 3 February 1969: Flight 7 was hijacked to Cuba. The presence of Candid Camera host Allen Funt on the flight led many of the passengers to conclude that the hijacking was actually a prank. Funt and others were later released after 11 hours of captivity.
 17 March 1970: Both pilots of Eastern Air Lines Shuttle Flight 1320, a DC-9-31 carrying 68 passengers and 5 crew, were shot by a deranged hijacker. The first officer was able to take the hijacker's gun and shoot him three times before succumbing to his own wounds. Despite gunshot wounds in both arms, the captain was able to fight off the wounded hijacker and land the aircraft safely.

New Eastern Air Lines

In 2011, a group purchased the intellectual property, including trademarks, of Eastern Air Lines and formed the Eastern Air Lines Group. The group announced in early 2014 that it had filed an application with the United States Department of Transportation for a Certificate of Public Convenience and Necessity, which will be followed by certification with the Federal Aviation Administration. The new airline began service through charter and wet-lease flights out of Miami International in late 2014 with Boeing 737-800 jetliners painted in the classic Eastern "hockey stick" livery. The IATA and ICAO codes of the original airline, as well as its callsign, were used by the new iteration of Eastern Air Lines. After a sale to Swift Air, the trademarks were passed on to Eastern Airlines, LLC in 2018. On January 12, 2020, after nearly two decades of being officially defunct, the first flight of the renewed Eastern Airlines landed at JFK airport, heralding a new era for the brand name.

See also

 Charles Townsend Ludington, base source of airlines
 List of defunct airlines of the United States
 John McGraw, medical director

References

Notes

Bibliography

 Rickenbacker, Edward V. Rickenbacker: An Autobiography. New York: Prentice Hall, 1967.
 Robinson, Jack E. Freefall: The Needless Destruction Of Eastern Air Lines. New York: HarperBusiness, 1992.

External links

 Airline Timetable Images provides many Eastern timetables from 1928 to 1988, including route maps, schedules, and fares.
 Route Maps Online has timetables from the 1960s to 1990s, showing actual route maps, schedules, and pricing information.
 Aviation Safety Network list of Eastern Air Lines accidents from 1943 to 1990 
 Eastern Airlines Indicted in Scheme Over Maintenance - The New York Times
 SHUGRUE RECOUNTS EASTERN'S FINAL DAYS SAYS FINAL NAIL WAS DECEMBER'S DISMAL SHOWING - Miami Herald
 Airlinecolors.com Images, historical overview, and promotional materials
 Eastern Air Lines Collections from Georgia State University

 
Airlines established in 1926
Airlines disestablished in 1991
Companies based in Miami-Dade County, Florida
Defunct companies based in Florida
Airlines based in Florida
Companies that filed for Chapter 11 bankruptcy in 1989
1926 establishments in Florida
1991 disestablishments in Florida
Defunct airlines of the United States
American companies established in 1926
American companies disestablished in 1991